Siripong or Siripongs is a Thai name. People with the name include:

Given name
 Siripong Kongjaopha (born 1997), Thai professional footballer
 Siripong Siripool (born 1965), Thai badminton player

Surname
 Jaturun Siripongs (1951–1999), Thai convicted criminal executed in California